Umbilical may refer to:

Umbilical cable
Umbilical cord
Umbilical fold
Umbilical hernia
Umbilical notch
Umbilical vessels
Umbilical artery
Umbilical vein
Umbilical zone
The Umbilical Brothers, two Australian comedic performers, David and Shane
Umbilical point, a locally spherical point on a mathematical surface.
Umbilical region
Umbilical (album), a 2011 album of Tiago Iorc, Brazilian musician
"Umbilical", a song by Arca from Sheep

See also 
Umbilicus (disambiguation)